Villenouvelle station (French: Gare de Villenouvelle) is a railway station in Villenouvelle, Occitanie, southern France. Within TER Occitanie, it is part of line 10 (Toulouse–Narbonne).

References

Railway stations in Haute-Garonne
Railway stations in France opened in 1857